Give 'Em Hell is the debut album by the British heavy metal band Witchfynde. The album was released in 1980 during the new wave of British heavy metal heyday and re-released in 2004 by Lemon Recordings. The 2004 re-release featured three bonus tracks ("The Devil's Gallop", "Tetelestai", and "Wake Up Screaming").

The album has been cited as a relevant example for the production of the NWOBHM scene and as an inspiration for the black metal subgenre.

Track listing

2004 CD reissue

Personnel
 Steve Bridges – vocals
 Montalo – guitar
 Andro Coulton – bass
 Gra Scoresby – drums
 Roy Neave – engineer

References

1980 debut albums
New Wave of British Heavy Metal albums